The 1951 Goodwood Trophy was a non-championship Formula One motor race held at the Goodwood Circuit on 29 September 1951. The race was won by Giuseppe Farina in an Alfa Romeo 159, setting fastest lap in the process. Reg Parnell in a Ferrari 375 was second and Tony Rolt third in a Delage 15S8-ERA.

Results

References

Goodwood Trophy